Talwawade may refer to:

 Talawade, Belgaum, a village in Karnataka, India
 Talawade, Pune, a village in Maharashtra India
 Talawade, Vikramgad, a village in Maharashtra, India